California Conquest is a 1952 American Western film directed by Lew Landers and starring Cornel Wilde and Teresa Wright.  The film is set in the early 1840s, and deals with a conspiracy by native Hidalgo Californios to deliver the then-Mexican territory of California to the Russian Empire.

Plot 
Don Arturo Bordega (Cornel Wilde) is part of the old Spanish nobility, and a vocal advocate for California'a annexation by the United States. On his way to a secret meeting in support of that goal, he is attacked by bandits led by José Martínez (Alfonso Bedoya), but narrowly escapes. The planned "guest of honor" at the secret meeting to which Bordega is en route, is none other than then-U.S. Army Captain John Charles Fremont. Martinez's thugs attempt to assassinate Fremont while he is traveling to the same meeting, but succeed only in lightly wounding him. At the meeting, he reveals that the US does not intend to annex California.

It is subsequently revealed that the corrupt Brios brothers, Ernesto (Eugene Iglesias) and Fredo (John Dehner) have paid Martinez to violently oppose the movement advocating American annexation of California, as part of their unscrupulous plot to deliver California to the imperial domain of the Russian Czar (in exchange for a promise to appoint first Ernesto, and later Fredo, as the Russian colonial governor).

Martinez's men violently seize a quantity of rifles from gunsmith Sam Lawrence (Hank Patterson), in order to arm a force in support of the Russian conquest of California. This invokes the wrath of his beautiful daughter, Julia (Teresa Wright), who winds up joining Arturo Bordega in his mission to infiltrate Martinez's bandit group, in order to foil their part in the nefarious scheme. Martinez is eventually killed by Julia Lawrence (and Ernesto Brios is slain by Bordega in a duel), during a period in which they learn the nature of the Brios' plot. Arturo Bordega and Julia Lawrence eventually travel to Fort Ross, where they are able to capture Fredo Brios (as well as a fictional Russian princess, Helena de Gagarine, and a high-ranking Russian army officer), and otherwise manage to thwart the treasonous conspiracy. During the course of their travels together, Bordega and Lawrence fall in love, and the film concludes with their stated intent to marry, and "have 14 children."

Cast
 Cornel Wilde as Don Arturo Bordega  
 Teresa Wright as Julie Lawrence 
 Alfonso Bedoya as José Martínez  
 Lisa Ferraday as Helena de Gagarine  
 Eugene Iglesias as Ernesto Brios 
 John Dehner as Fredo Brios  
 Ivan Lebedeff as Alexander Rotcheff 
 Tito Renaldo as  Don Bernardo Mirana  
 Renzo Cesana as Fr. Lindos
 Baynes Barron as Igna'cio
 Rico Alaniz as Pedro
 William Wilkerson as Fernando (as William P. Wilkerson)
 Edward Colmans as Juan Junipero
 Alex Montoya as Juan

See also
 List of American films of 1952

References

External links
 

1952 films
1952 Western (genre) films
American Western (genre) films
Columbia Pictures films
Films directed by Lew Landers
Films set in California
Films set in the 1840s
1950s English-language films
1950s American films